Insulivitrina mascaensis is a species of gastropod in the Vitrinidae family. It is endemic to Spain.

References

Fauna of Spain
Insulivitrina
Gastropods described in 1986
Endemic fauna of Spain
Taxonomy articles created by Polbot
Taxobox binomials not recognized by IUCN